Richard Leonard 'Len' Tuckey is an English musician, songwriter, composer and record producer. In a career spanning more than 40 years, Tuckey was the guitarist for The Chasers (who had records produced by Chris Andrews)  and The Riot Squad before joining the Nashville Teens,
and came to prominence in the early 1970s as the lead guitarist for Suzi Quatro. He is credited as the co-writer of many of Quatro's songs, including hits such as "Mama's Boy".

Musical career
In the 1960s Tuckey was a member of the bands The Chasers and The Riot Squad. In 1968 Tuckey joined the Nashville Teens, and in 1972 Tuckey joined Suzi Quatro's backing band and came to worldwide prominence. After leaving Quatro's band he formed blues-rock band "Legend" with Bill Legend of T. Rex and for a while managed a version of Slade featuring original members Dave Hill and Don Powell.

Personal life
In 1976, Tuckey married Suzi Quatro. They had two children together (Laura in 1982 and Richard Leonard in 1984) and divorced in 1992.

References

1945 births
20th-century British guitarists
20th-century English composers
English record producers
English rock guitarists
English songwriters
Lead guitarists
Living people